Keith Robert Blackwell (born July 4, 1975) is a former Associate Justice of the Supreme Court of Georgia.

Education

Blackwell received his Bachelor of Arts in political science from the University of Georgia in 1996 and his Juris Doctor from the University of Georgia School of Law in 1999.

Judicial career 

He was a judge of the Georgia Court of Appeals, to which he was appointed by Governor Sonny Perdue on November 1, 2010. He was later named to the Supreme Court of Georgia by Governor Nathan Deal on June 25, 2012. On February 28, 2020, Blackwell announced his intention to resign, effective November 18, 2020.

Possible appointment to U.S. Supreme Court 

In September 2016, he was named as a possible Supreme Court of the United States nominee by Donald Trump.

Electoral history
2014

See also
 Donald Trump Supreme Court candidates

References

External links
 Biography from the Supreme Court of Georgia's website

|-

1975 births
Living people
21st-century American lawyers
21st-century American judges
Federalist Society members
Georgia (U.S. state) lawyers
Georgia Court of Appeals judges
People from Cherokee County, Georgia
Place of birth missing (living people)
Justices of the Supreme Court of Georgia (U.S. state)
University of Georgia School of Law alumni